The Diocese of North China, also known as Hua Pei Diocese, was an Anglican diocese in China established under the supervision of the Church of England. From 1875 till the establishment of the Anglican-Episcopal Province of China in 1912, the diocesan headquarters were located in the compound of Holy Trinity Church, Shanghai.

Bishops of the Diocese
1872–1879: William Armstrong Russell, who also had some functions in the region before the creation of the diocese.
1880–1913: Charles Perry Scott
1914–1940: Francis Lushington Norris

Assistant Bishops
Tsae-seng Sing, Assistant Bishop in the Diocese 1918–1940

See also 
 All Saints' Church, Tianjin
 Dalian Anglican Church
 Diocese of Western China

References

Church Work in North China: A Sketch of the Church of England mission in North China, together with an Account of the Formation of the Diocese (1891)
H.H. Montgomery, Charles Perry Scott: First Bishop in North China (Society for the Propagation of the Gospel in Foreign Parts, 1928.)
公禱書: 在華北教區試用, 主教鄂方智  The Book of Common Prayer in Chinese, authorized for the Diocese of North China (1937)

Religious organizations established in 1891
Anglican dioceses established in the 19th century
North China
1891 establishments in China
Northern China